During the closing ceremony in Sochi, Russia most of the 88 nations competing selected one member of their delegation to be the flagbearer. Some countries for example, Morocco chose the same athlete (Adam Lamhamedi) as the opening ceremony. On the other hand, some countries such as Luxembourg had already left the Olympic village, and therefore a volunteer carried the flags for those countries.

Countries and flagbearers
Below is a list of all parading countries with their announced flag bearer, sorted in the order in which they appeared in the parade. This is sortable by country name under which they entered, the flag bearer's name, or the flag bearer's sport. Names are given as were officially designated by the International Olympic Committee (IOC).

*Rudy Rinaldi of Monaco was the reserve athlete (and thus did not compete) in the 2-man bobsledding event.

References

2014 Winter Olympics
Lists of Olympic flag bearers